Lyudmila Grigoryevna Postnova (born 11 August 1984) is a former Russian handball player for, who last played for HC Astrakhanochka and the Russian women's national handball team. Postnova is considered one of the greatest Russian players of all time.

She won gold medal with the Russian winning team at the 2005 World Women's Handball Championship in Saint Petersburg, Russia, again at the 2007 World Women's Handball Championship in France, and once more at the 2009 World Women's Handball Championship in China, when she was also given the title of Most Valuable Player of the championship. She has played for Russian club Lada Togliatti from 2004 to 2009. Since 2010, she is playing for Zvezda Zvenigorod. In February 2016 she returns to play handball at HC Astrakhanochka.

References

1984 births
Living people
Sportspeople from Yaroslavl
Russian female handball players
Handball players at the 2008 Summer Olympics
Olympic handball players of Russia
Olympic silver medalists for Russia
Olympic medalists in handball
Handball players at the 2012 Summer Olympics
Medalists at the 2008 Summer Olympics
20th-century Russian women
21st-century Russian women